Owrta Kand or Urta Kand or Urtakand may refer to:
 Owrta Kand, East Azerbaijan
 Urtakand, Razavi Khorasan
 Urta Kand, Bukan, West Azerbaijan Province
 Urtakand, Chaldoran, West Azerbaijan Province